The sailback houndshark (Gogolia filewoodi) is a houndshark of the family Triakidae, and the only member of the genus Gogolia. It is found in the deep waters of continental shelf off northern Papua New Guinea. Only one specimen has been found, at a depth of 73 m. It measured 74 cm in length. The reproduction of this shark is ovoviviparous.

References

 

sailback houndshark
Fish of Papua New Guinea
sailback houndshark
sailback houndshark
Endemic fauna of Papua New Guinea